Michael Alan Johnson (October 7, 1943 – March 19, 2003) is a former American football cornerback in the National Football League (NFL) for the Dallas Cowboys. He was drafted by the Oakland Raiders in the 14th round of the 1966 AFL Draft. He played college football at the University of Kansas.

Early years
Johnson attended Garden City High School before moving on to the University of Kansas, where he was a part of the same offensive backfield as Gale Sayers. Injuries affected his production in college, including as a senior, when he was going to be the featured running back.

Professional career
Johnson was selected by the Oakland Raiders in the 14th round (125th overall) of the 1966 AFL Draft, but instead chose to sign with the NFL's Dallas Cowboys as a free agent in 1966. He was converted into a defensive back, based on how the Cowboys saw him tackle on special teams in college. As a rookie, besides playing special teams, he was also used as a linebacker, when the other teams employed their two-minute offense.

In 1967, he passed Warren Livingston on the depth chart for the right cornerback starting position and finished with 5 interceptions.

In 1968, he registered 3 interceptions, but was back on the bench after Dick Daniels was moved to safety and Mel Renfro to right cornerback. In 1969, he lost his starting job to Phil Clark.

On August 3, 1970, he was traded to the Chicago Bears in exchange for a draft choice (not exercised). He was released on September 8.

References

External links
Johnson Does Everything For Kansas
Johnson Making Good with the Dallas Cowboys

Living people
1943 births
People from Garden City, Kansas
Players of American football from Kansas
American football cornerbacks
African-American players of American football
Kansas Jayhawks football players
Dallas Cowboys players
Players of American football from Denver
21st-century African-American people
20th-century African-American sportspeople